Norman Hyde (born February 1945) is a British motorcycle development engineer, racer and world record holder.

Hyde joined Triumph motorcycles as an apprentice in 1964.  Following the closure of the factory at Meriden in 1973, Norman moved to the Kitts Green site run by Norton Triumph International.  When that shut down in 1975 he  used his redundancy payment to establish his own business, designing and selling performance parts for Triumph twins and triples.     
Having passed his mechanical engineering diploma with flying colours in 1968 Norman secured a position in Triumph’s racing development department, working under Doug Hele, the legendary Chief Development Engineer.   As a result, Norman was directly involved in the development of the T120, T140, T150, T160 and T180 twins and triples, as well as projects that never made it into production, like the four-cylinder  Quadrent, OHC Triple and 350cc Bandit twin.  He and his colleagues also supported the factory’s racers, including Percy Tait.   Hyde is particularly proud of the Triumph Trident triple, launched in 1969, which, along with the Honda 750/4, redefined the sportsbike sector of that era.

Hyde also used his engineering skills to compete in drag racing and sprinting.  In 1968 he took the World Record for a standing start 1/4 mile in his Triumph 350cc sidecar outfit and in 1969 he beat the World Record for a standing start kilometre on a Triumph 500cc twin (set by the works Gilera two years previously).  In 1972 Norman captured the World Sidecar Land Speed Record on his Roadrunner III 850cc Triumph Trident powered outfit, at an average speed of 161.8 mph, a record that remained unbeaten for over 35 years.

Having started his own performance parts business early in 1976, Hyde used his engineering experience to design his own bikes and in 1987 he introduced the Hyde Harrier, a café racer kit for Bonneville and Trident engines using a frame developed with Harris Performance in Hertforsdshire.  This was followed up in 1995 by the Hornet, a 126 mph single-cylinder motorcycle, also Harris-framed, powered by a 600cc Rotax engines tuned to produce 70 bhp.  Following the rebirth of Triumph at their new Hinckley factory and the introduction of the retro-styled Bonneville, Norman introduced a wide range of performance and styling parts for the new British twins.

Hyde retired in 2018 and was recognised for his contribution to the British motorcycle industry by the Triumph Owners Motor Cycle Club, who appointed him as their patron.

References

External links
Official site

Living people
British motorcycle racers
1945 births